The 2022 AFC U-23 Asian Cup will be an under-23 international football tournament organised by the Asian Football Confederation, taking place in Uzbekistan between 1–19 June 2022. The sixteen national teams involved in the tournament were required to register a squad of a minimum of 18 and a maximum of 23 players, including at least three goalkeepers (Regulations Article 29). Only players in these squads were eligible to take part in the competition. The tournament exclusively requires players to be born on or after 1 January 1999 to be eligible (Regulations Article 26).

Each national team had to register a preliminary list of minimum of 18 and maximum of 50 players (including at least four goalkeepers) via the Asian Football Confederation Administration System (AFCAS) no later than 30 days before to its first match of the tournament. Teams were able to replace or add up to 5 players to their preliminary list no later than 7 days before to its first match of the tournament provided that the maximum number of registered players is not exceeded (Regulations Article 25). The final list of 18−23 players per national team had to be submitted to the AFC at least 10 days prior to its first match of the tournament. All players in the final selection must have been registered in the preliminary list (Regulations Article 26.3).

Once the final lists have been received by the AFC, teams may replace any player up to 6 hours prior to their first match of the tournament. Any replacement player must come from the preliminary list (Regulations Article 26.2).

The age listed for each player is as of 1 June 2022, the first day of the tournament.

Group A 
The group A final squads were announced by the AFC on 26 May 2022.

Uzbekistan 
Head coach: Timur Kapadze

Iran 
The final squad of 23 players was announced on 21 May 2022.

Head coach: Mehdi Mahdavikia

Qatar 
The final squad of 23 players was announced on 23 May 2022.

Head coach:  Nicolás Córdova

Turkmenistan 
Head coach: Ahmet Agamyradow

Group B 
The group B final squads were announced by the AFC on 27 May 2022.

Australia 
The final squad of 23 players was announced on 18 May 2022.

Head coach: Trevor Morgan

Jordan 
The final squad of 23 players was announced on 16 May 2022.

Head coach: Ahmad Hayel

Iraq 

Head coach:  Miroslav Soukup

Kuwait 
Head coach: Abdulaziz Hamada

Group C 
The group C final squads were announced by the AFC on 27 May 2022.

South Korea 
The final squad was announced on 16 May 2022. On 27 May, Um Won-sang was replaced by Yang Hyun-jun, as the former got a callup from the senior national team.

Head coach: Hwang Sun-hong

Thailand 
The preliminary 23 man squad was announced on 26 May 2022.

Head coach: Worrawoot Srimaka

Vietnam 
The preliminary 25 man squad was announced on 23 May 2022. The final squad of 23 players was announced on 1 June 2022.

Head coach:  Gong Oh-kyun

Malaysia 
The final squad was announced on 28 May 2022.

Head coach:  Brad Maloney

Group D 
The group D final squads were announced by the AFC on 29 May 2022.

Saudi Arabia 
The final squad of 23 players was announced on 26 May 2022. On 31 May, Muhannad Al-Shanqeeti and Musab Al-Juwayr withdrew from the squad due to injury and were replaced by Saad Balobaid and Ahmed Al-Ghamdi.

Head coach: Saad Al-Shehri

United Arab Emirates 

The final squad of 23 players was announced on 30 May 2022.

Head coach:  Denis Silva Puig

Japan 
A squad of 21 players was announced on 24 May 2022. Yutaro Oda was ruled out of the squad after picking up an injury, and on 27−28 May 2022, Sato, Nakashima and Yamada were called up to replace him, completing a 23-player squad. On 29 May 2022, Ryuya Nishio was also ruled out with an injury and was replaced by Kimura.

Head coach: Go Oiwa

Tajikistan 
The final squad of 23 players was announced on 30 May 2022.

Head coach: Aslidin Khabibulloev

References 

2022 AFC U-23 Asian Cup
2022 in Asian football